"How Come U Don't Call Me Anymore?" is a song by Prince. It is a ballad of romantic longing with some gospel elements. On his original recording of the song, which was released as the non-album B-side to his 1982 single "1999", Prince performs most of the song in his falsetto range, with his own bluesy piano playing providing the only instrumental accompaniment. The song's first album appearance was on his 1993 compilation The Hits/The B-Sides. It was later included on the soundtrack to the 1996 film Girl 6. Prince also performs the song on his 2002 live album One Nite Alone... Live!.

Artists who have covered the song include Stephanie Mills (1983), Joshua Redman (1998), and Alicia Keys (2001). Bilal recorded the song which appears on his 2001 single "Fast Lane". Roger Cicero recorded the song with Soulounge for the 2004 album Home; a live version by Cicero is included on his 2008 single "Alle Möbel verrückt". American Idol season 11 finalist Jessica Sanchez performed the song on the American Idols LIVE! Tour 2012.

Alicia Keys version

Recording and production
Alicia Keys recorded a cover of the song—retitled "How Come You Don't Call Me"—for her debut studio album Songs in A Minor (2001). She later told Billboard: "I had never heard [the original] before. They gave me a copy of the song on tape. I played it every day for three weeks. It is so raw and so truthful – I was just feeling it. It really came out well."

Keys' cover of "How Come You Don't Call Me" was inspired by a long-term relationship with a partner, and was produced by herself alongside Kerry Brothers, Jr. An official remix of the song, produced by the Neptunes, was included on the Remixed & Unplugged in A Minor reissue of Songs in A Minor in 2002. It features vocals from Justin Timberlake towards the end of the track.

Music video
The accompanying music video for "How Come You Don't Call Me" was directed by Little X. It contains references to Japanese popular culture, such as San-X's Buru Buru Dog and Cardcaptor Sakuras Kero-chan, besides Korean character Mashimaro. The video starts with Keys waking up in the morning, and following her daily routine throughout the video, ending with a performance on stage. The video ends with a phone call from her supposed "boyfriend" (portrayed by Mike Epps) making an excuse about why he hasn't called her, and she hangs up on him, laughing.

Critical reception
Mark Anthony Neal of PopMatters felt that the song was credible, but fell short from the original or Stephanie Mills' 1983 cover. Keys has said that Prince told her he loved her cover of the song.

Track listings and formats
UK and Irish CD single and European promotional CD single
 "How Come You Don't Call Me" (Original Radio Version) – 3:31	
 "How Come You Don't Call Me" (Neptunes Remix) – 4:23

UK and Irish maxi CD single
 "How Come You Don't Call Me" (Original Radio Version) – 3:31	
 "How Come You Don't Call Me" (Neptunes Remix) – 4:23 	
 "How Come You Don't Call Me" (Live Version) – 5:18 	
 "Butterflyz" (Roger's Release Mix) – 9:11 	
 "How Come You Don't Call Me" (Video)

European maxi CD single
 "How Come You Don't Call Me" (Original Radio Version) – 3:31	
 "How Come You Don't Call Me" (Neptunes Remix) – 4:23 	
 "Butterflyz" (Roger's Release Mix) – 9:11 	
 "How Come You Don't Call Me" (Video)

Australian and New Zealand maxi CD single
 "How Come You Don't Call Me" (Neptunes Remix) – 4:23 
 "How Come You Don't Call Me" (Original Radio Version) – 3:31
 "How Come You Don't Call Me" (Album Version) – 3:57
 "How Come You Don't Call Me" (Video)

Spanish promotional CD single
 "How Come You Don't Call Me" (Remix) – 4:23 
 "How Come You Don't Call Me" (Radio Edit) – 3:31

US promotional CD single
 "How Come You Don't Call Me" (Radio Edit) – 3:31
 "How Come You Don't Call Me" (Instrumental) – 3:59
 "How Come You Don't Call Me" (Call Out Hook) – 0:10

US promotional CD single (Neptunes Remix)
 "How Come You Don't Call Me" (Radio Edit) – 4:23
 "How Come You Don't Call Me" (Instrumental) – 4:33
 "How Come You Don't Call Me" (Call Out Hook) – 0:10

US 12-inch vinyl
A. "How Come You Don't Call Me" (Neptunes Remix – Main) – 4:21 	
B. "How Come You Don't Call Me" (Neptunes Remix – Instrumental) – 4:21

UK 12-inch vinyl
A1. "How Come You Don't Call Me" (Original Album Version) – 3:57
A2. "How Come You Don't Call Me" (Neptunes Remix) – 4:23		
B1. "Butterflyz" (Roger's Release Mix) – 9:11

UK promotional 12-inch vinyl
A1. "How Come You Don't Call Me" (Neptunes Remix) – 4:23 	
A2. "Troubles" (Jay-J & Chris Lum Moulton Mix) – 8:59 	
B1. "Butterflyz" (Roger Sanchez Club Mix) – 9:11 	
B2. "How Come You Don't Call Me" (Live Version) – 3:10

Credits and personnel
 Alicia Keys – lead vocals, backing vocals, production, all other instruments
 Kerry "Krucial" Brothers – production, drum programming
 Russ Elevado – mixing

Charts

Release history

References

External links
How Come You Don't Call Me at Discogs

1980s ballads
1982 songs
2002 singles
Alicia Keys songs
Music videos directed by Director X
Prince (musician) songs
Rhythm and blues ballads
Song recordings produced by Prince (musician)
Songs written by Prince (musician)
Stephanie Mills songs
Soul ballads